Philodendron cordatum, is an uncommon, toxic species not often found or offered as a houseplant. It is native to a small region in Southeastern coastal Brazil,  not far from Rio de Janeiro and São Paulo. It is an epiphytic and epilithic species of Philodendron (growing upon trees or rock outcroppings). This philodendron is typically a vining plant and can tolerate shade. It is toxic to humans and most animals if consumed. Toxic principle is calcium oxalate. It has heart-shaped, dark green leaves that generally grow 2″ to 3” across with white speckles on the more mature leaves.

This name is often mistakenly applied to the  popular  houseplant Philodendron hederaceum, the ivy Philodendron. While "cordatum" means heart-shaped and both species have heart-shaped leaves the species name cannot be applied to the ivy Philodendron.

References

External links
 Plants in the Exotic Rainforest Collection

cordatum
Epiphytes